Jacques Taborski (born 8 April 1957) is a French rower. He competed in the men's eight event at the 1984 Summer Olympics.

References

1957 births
Living people
French male rowers
Olympic rowers of France
Rowers at the 1984 Summer Olympics
Place of birth missing (living people)